Hedong Commandery was a historical region in the Qin and Han dynasties of ancient China.
Hedong was located to the east of the Yellow River in Shanxi (around present-day Yuncheng).

History
Hedong Commandery was established by the Qin state during the Warring States Period. Its seat was Anyi, the former capital of Wei. During the Western Han dynasty, It administered 24 counties: Anyi (安邑), Dayang (大陽), Yishi (猗氏), Xie (解), Puban (蒲反), Hebei (河北), Zuoyi (左邑), Fenyin (汾陰), Wenxi (聞喜), Huoze (濩澤), Duanshi (端氏), Linfen (臨汾), Yuan (垣), Pishi (皮氏), Changxiu (長脩), Pingyang (平陽), Xiangling (襄陵), Zhi (彘), Yang (楊), Beiqu (北屈), Puzi (蒲子), Jiang (絳), Hunie (狐讘) and Qi (騏). In 2 AD, the commandery had a population of 962,912, in 236,896 households.

During the Cao Wei dynasty, a separate Pingyang Commandery was formed from several counties of Hedong. In early Jin dynasty, Hedong administered nine counties, including Anyi, Wenxi, Yuan, Fenyang, Dayang, Yishi, Xie, Puban and Hebei. In the Northern dynasties, part of the commandery was separated to form the new Hebei Commandery, and several counties became part of other commanderies. 

In 583, the commandery was merged into Pu Prefecture (蒲州). Later, Hedong Commandery would become an alternative name of Pu. In 742, the population was 469,213, in 70,800 households.

Famous People
 Guan Yu
 Xu Huang
 Pei clan of Hedong

References

Commanderies of the Qin dynasty
Commanderies of the Han dynasty
Former commanderies of China
Commanderies of the Northern dynasties